Country Weekly was an American magazine about country music. Renamed Nash Country Weekly in 2015, it was in circulation between April 1994 and May 2016. The publisher, Cumulus Media, now maintains the site Nash Country Daily.

Overview
The magazine was established in 1994 by American Media, Inc. It focused on country music stars and events, and regularly featured exclusive interviews with recording artists and country music news. Country Weekly also cosponsored the CMT/TNN Country Weekly Music Awards, at the time the only nationally televised country music awards show that allowed fans to vote for the winners.

In February 2009, Country Weekly reverted to a weekly magazine, having been issued fortnightly since 1999. The magazine also dropped subscriptions at that point (which it later reinstated), and changed its logo. Cumulus Media acquired Country Weekly in 2014. The magazine was renamed Nash Country Weekly in June 2015, as a means of co-branding with Nash FM. Nash Country Weekly closed its print publication in April 2016.

On May 6, 2016, Cumulus launched Nash Country Daily as an online media site.

References

External links
 

1994 establishments in Tennessee
2016 disestablishments in Tennessee
American country music
Music magazines published in the United States
Weekly magazines published in the United States
Defunct magazines published in the United States
Biweekly magazines published in the United States
Magazines established in 1994
Magazines disestablished in 2016
Magazines published in Tennessee
Mass media in Nashville, Tennessee